Lovely Ann Warren (born July 1, 1977) is an American politician and lawyer who served as the 69th mayor of Rochester, New York from 2014 until her resignation in 2021. She was previously the President of the Rochester City Council. She was the first woman to serve as mayor of Rochester, as well as the second African-American after William A. Johnson Jr.

Early life and education
Warren was born and raised in Rochester, New York. Her mother, Elrita Warren, a South Carolina native, who once worked at Kodak, ultimately became a health aide in nursing homes and hospitals.

Warren graduated from Wilson Magnet High School and later earned a Bachelor of Arts degree in Government from John Jay College of Criminal Justice, followed by a Juris Doctor degree from Albany Law School of Union University.

Career 
Warren began her career as a legislative assistant and chief of staff to New York Assemblyman David F. Gantt. She clerked for Rochester City Court Judge Teresa Johnson. She served as summer law clerk to New York Attorney General Eliot Spitzer. In 2004, Warren was admitted to the New York State Bar Association.

In 2007 Warren was elected to the Rochester's City Council. In 2010 she was elected as the fifth president of the Rochester City Council, the youngest in Rochester's history.

In 2011, she was a participant in the We Live NY Summit at Cornell University. She has appeared on panels sponsored by Rochester Downtown Development Corporation and the Rochester Chapter of the League of Women Voters. She also hosts a youth event at City Hall for students of the Rochester City School District. She has been a guest speaker at events for young people in the Rochester City School District and colleges including, the University of Rochester, Albany Law School of Union University, Towson University and Howard University.

2013 Rochester mayoral election

She won the 2013 Democratic primary over incumbent mayor Thomas Richards 57 percent to 42 percent.

While Richards endorsed Warren and ended his active campaign, he remained a candidate on the Independence and Working Families lines. The Independence Party created the grassroots Turn Out for Tom campaign in an effort to get Richards re-elected mayor. Warren defeated Richards in the general election 55 to 39 percent.

Tenure

Warren was sworn in as Rochester's 69th mayor on January 1, 2014. She began her second term on January 1, 2018 after winning re-election in 2017.

Since taking office, Mayor Warren has focused on "job creation, fostering safer and more vibrant neighborhoods and improving educational opportunities for Rochester’s residents." Warren also oversaw the Inner Loop East project, started under the Richards administration, which filled in the eastern section of the Inner Loop expressway, turning it into a street and allowing for construction of new buildings.

Warren has launched several strategic initiatives, including the introduction of a Kiva crowd funding loan program, a Vanpool, support for ride-sharing such as Uber and Lyft, and a market-driven community co-operative called OWN Rochester.

Under Warren's direction, the Rochester Police Department underwent a reorganization to implement a neighborhood-based patrol model that converted the patrol structure from two Patrol Divisions (each covering half of the city) to five smaller Patrol Sections. The RPD also implemented a successful body worn video program during Warren's first term.

Warren convened an early learning council to help expand Pre-K programs in the city. She also developed a "3 to 3 Initiative" to help children to set three-year-old children on a path to read at grade level by third grade. To help achieve these goals, she eliminated fines for children's books and materials at city libraries.

In December 2016, Warren ended the city's red light camera program.  The insurance industry objected, citing its own studies which showed that cities that had used red light cameras between 2010 and 2014 had had a 21% drop in the number of fatal red light running crashes, while cities that had stopped using the cameras had had a 30% increase in such deaths. In response to these studies, Warren justified her decision to remove the cameras by saying, "I reached the conclusion the benefits simply don't justify a further extension... I'm very concerned that too many of these tickets have been issued to those who simply can't afford them, which is counter-productive to our efforts to reverse our city's troubling rates of poverty."

Though designated as an elector in the 2020 Presidential Election, New York Assembly Majority leader Crystal Peoples-Stokes, served as her alternate.

On June 22, 2021, following a troubled second term, Warren lost the Democratic primary to Rochester city councilman Malik Evans, conceding the race to Evans later that night. As part of a plea deal to resolve her charges of breaking campaign finance rules in the 2017 election, Warren formally stepped down as mayor on December 1, with deputy mayor James Smith serving as acting mayor until Evans was inaugurated on January 1, 2022. Her final act in office was to submit a proposal for a guaranteed basic income pilot program for impoverished families in the city.

Controversies
Warren's Facebook account was temporarily suspended on December 22, 2014, when pictures of a chat log were shared over the internet and social media.

Allegations and conviction of election campaign finance meddling
Following the 2017 Rochester mayoral election, in which two of Warren's primary opponents filed separate complaints, the New York State Board of Elections found evidence that Warren's campaign violated finance and campaigning laws with her PAC, and alleged that the mayor was directly involved. Warren's lawyer denied the allegations.

In October 2020, Warren was indicted on two felony charges of breaking campaign finance rules. She pled not guilty to both charges. Had the case gone to trial and resulted in a conviction, she faced up to a four-year prison sentence, having her law license revoked, and being removed from office as mayor.

On October 4, 2021, Warren accepted a plea deal prior to her trial that would downgrade her felony charges to misdemeanors, with two assistants also pleading guilty. As part of the deal, which also resolves charges from an unrelated case, she retained her law license but was forced to resign as mayor, effective on December 1.

Death of Daniel Prude
Warren faced significant backlash after the March 2020 Death of Daniel Prude at the hands of Rochester police and her failure to publicly comment on the investigation into it. On March 12, 2021, a probe by the city council determined that Mayor Warren and then-Rochester Chief of Police La'Ron Singletary concealed critical details about Prude's death from the public and lied about their knowledge of the case.

Husband's arrest
On May 19, 2021, the New York State Police served a warrant at her house in accordance with a seven-month long wiretap investigation related to a “significant” mid-level narcotics ring.  Timothy Granison, Warren’s husband, was arrested, alleged to be a part of the operation.  Seven other homes around the city were raided, and six others were charged.  The raids yielded more than two kilos of crack and powdered cocaine - with a value estimated around $60,000 - several firearms, and over $100,000 in cash.

Granison was arraigned on charges of possession of 31 grams of cocaine with intent to sell, and illegal possession of a handgun. Police say the drugs were found in his car during a traffic stop, and the gun was found in the mayor’s house during the search.  A semi-automatic rifle was also found in the home, with an unknown legal status. Granison pled not guilty and was released on his own recognizance.

Monroe County District Attorney Sandra Doorley said the narcotics investigation is separate from campaign finance fraud investigation of Warren, and that Warren is uninvolved.  Doorley denied any political motivation for the investigation, noting that Granison was not the original target of the wiretap, and that once she was aware of his involvement, “we followed the evidence, as simply as that”. Though Warren was not charged with drug possession, she was later indicted on July 16, 2021 along with Granison for criminal possession of a firearm, two counts of child endangerment, and two counts of failure to lock/secure firearms in a dwelling. Warren's charges in this case were resolved as part of the her plea deal involving her campaign finance case.

Granison was previously part of a 1997 armed robbery of a jewelry store, when he was 17.  Granison — the getaway driver — pled guilty to the charges, was given five years probation, and had his criminal record wiped after being granted youthful offender status. This was a point of debate in the 2013 mayoral election.

Personal life
Warren and her husband Timothy Granison have one daughter together. Following Granison's arrest on drug and weapons charges in 2021, Warren has stated that she and Granison had been "legally separated" for several years. In a press conference, Warren added, "I find the timing of yesterday's events, three weeks before early voting [for the mayoral primary] starts, to be highly suspicious," and, "There's nothing implicating me in these charges announced today, because I've done nothing wrong."

In 2016 Warren put a red, white and blue sign next to Susan B. Anthony's grave the day after Hillary Clinton officially won the nomination for President at the 2016 Democratic National Convention. The sign stated, "Dear Susan B., we thought you might like to know that for the first time in history, a woman is running for president representing a major party. 144 years ago, your illegal vote got you arrested. It took another 48 years for women to finally gain the right to vote. Thank you for paving the way."

References

External links

Campaign website

1977 births
African-American mayors in New York (state)
Albany Law School alumni
John Jay College of Criminal Justice alumni
Living people
Mayors of Rochester, New York
New York (state) Democrats
Lawyers from Rochester, New York
2016 United States presidential electors
Women in New York (state) politics
Women mayors of places in New York (state)
21st-century American politicians
21st-century American women politicians
New York (state) politicians convicted of crimes
New York (state) politicians convicted of corruption
African-American city council members in New York (state)
Women city councillors in New York (state)
Rochester City Council members (New York)
2020 United States presidential electors
21st-century African-American women
21st-century African-American politicians
20th-century African-American people
20th-century African-American women
African-American women mayors